The Yakima Valley Subdivision is a railway line in southern Washington running about   Pasco, Washington to Ellensburg, Washington. It is operated by BNSF Railway and is considered part of the Northern Transcon.

References

External links
BNSF Subdivisions

BNSF Railway lines
Rail infrastructure in Washington (state)